Bucculatricidae or (Bucculatrigidae) is a family of moths. This small family has representatives in all parts of the world. Some authors place the group as a subfamily of the family Lyonetiidae.

Adults of this family are easily overlooked, being very small with narrow wings wrapped around the body at rest. When small, the larvae are leaf-miners, forming distinctive brown blotches on leaves. When larger, they usually feed on the leaves externally. Many species have specific host plants. The pupal cases have distinctive longitudinal ridges, leading to members of the family commonly being called ribbed cocoon makers.

Some authors recognize just a single large genus, Bucculatrix, although two Australian genera, Cryphioxena and the scribbly gum moths (Ogmograptis spp.) are now sometimes placed in this family rather than in Elachistidae.

Species

Bucculatrix abdita
Bucculatrix abrepta
Bucculatrix absinthii
Bucculatrix acrogramma
Bucculatrix acuta
Bucculatrix adelpha
Bucculatrix agilis
Bucculatrix agnella
Bucculatrix ainsliella
Bucculatrix alaternella
Bucculatrix albaciliella
Bucculatrix albedinella
Bucculatrix albella
Bucculatrix albertiella
Bucculatrix albiguttella
Bucculatrix alpina
Bucculatrix altera
Bucculatrix amara
Bucculatrix ambrosiaefoliella
Bucculatrix amiculella
Bucculatrix anaticula
Bucculatrix andalusica
Bucculatrix angustata
Bucculatrix angustisquamella
Bucculatrix anthemidella
Bucculatrix anticolona
Bucculatrix applicita
Bucculatrix aquila
Bucculatrix argentisignella
Bucculatrix armata
Bucculatrix armeniaca
Bucculatrix arnicella
Bucculatrix artemisiella
Bucculatrix asphyctella
Bucculatrix atagina
Bucculatrix atrosignata
Bucculatrix basifuscella
Bucculatrix bechsteinella
Bucculatrix benacicolella
Bucculatrix benenotata
Bucculatrix bicinica
Bucculatrix bicolorella
Bucculatrix bicristata
Bucculatrix bifida
Bucculatrix bisucla
Bucculatrix brunnella
Bucculatrix brunnescens
Bucculatrix callistricha
Bucculatrix canadensisella
Bucculatrix canariensis
Bucculatrix cantabricella
Bucculatrix caribbea
Bucculatrix carolinae
Bucculatrix caspica
Bucculatrix ceanothiella
Bucculatrix ceibae
Bucculatrix centroptila
Bucculatrix cerina
Bucculatrix chrysanthemella
Bucculatrix cidarella
Bucculatrix cirrhographa
Bucculatrix citima
Bucculatrix clavenae
Bucculatrix clerotheta
Bucculatrix columbiana
Bucculatrix comporabile
Bucculatrix coniforma
Bucculatrix copeuta
Bucculatrix cordiaella
Bucculatrix coronatella
Bucculatrix crateracma
Bucculatrix cretica
Bucculatrix cristatella
Bucculatrix criticopa
Bucculatrix cuneigera
Bucculatrix damarana
Bucculatrix daures
Bucculatrix demaryella
Bucculatrix diacapna
Bucculatrix diffusella
Bucculatrix disjuncta
Bucculatrix divisa
Bucculatrix domicola
Bucculatrix dominatrix
Bucculatrix dulcis
Bucculatrix eclecta
Bucculatrix edocta
Bucculatrix enceliae
Bucculatrix endospiralis
Bucculatrix epibathra
Bucculatrix eremospora
Bucculatrix ericameriae
Bucculatrix eschatias
Bucculatrix eucalypti
Bucculatrix eugenmaraisi
Bucculatrix eugrapha
Bucculatrix eupatoriella
Bucculatrix eurotiella
Bucculatrix evanescens
Bucculatrix exedra
Bucculatrix extensa
Bucculatrix facilis
Bucculatrix fatigatella
Bucculatrix firmianella
Bucculatrix flexuosa
Bucculatrix floccosa
Bucculatrix flourensiae
Bucculatrix formosa
Bucculatrix frangutella
Bucculatrix franseriae
Bucculatrix frigida
Bucculatrix fugitans
Bucculatrix fusicola
Bucculatrix galeodes
Bucculatrix galinsogae
Bucculatrix gnaphaliella
Bucculatrix gossypiella
Bucculatrix gossypii
Bucculatrix gossypina
Bucculatrix hackeri
Bucculatrix hagnopis
Bucculatrix hamaboella
Bucculatrix helichrysella
Bucculatrix herbalbella
Bucculatrix hobohmi
Bucculatrix humiliella
Bucculatrix hypocypha
Bucculatrix hypsiphila
Bucculatrix ilecella
Bucculatrix illecebrosa
Bucculatrix immaculatella
Bucculatrix improvisa
Bucculatrix inchoata
Bucculatrix increpata
Bucculatrix infans
Bucculatrix insolita
Bucculatrix instigata
Bucculatrix inusitata
Bucculatrix iranica
Bucculatrix ivella
Bucculatrix jiblahensis
Bucculatrix kendalli
Bucculatrix khomasi
Bucculatrix kimballi
Bucculatrix kirkspriggsi
Bucculatrix koebelella
Bucculatrix kogii
Bucculatrix laciniatella
Bucculatrix lassella
Bucculatrix latella
Bucculatrix latviaella
Bucculatrix lavaterella
Bucculatrix lenis
Bucculatrix leptalea
Bucculatrix litigiosella
Bucculatrix locuples
Bucculatrix longispiralis
Bucculatrix longula
Bucculatrix lovtsovae
Bucculatrix loxoptila
Bucculatrix lustrella
Bucculatrix lutaria
Bucculatrix luteella
Bucculatrix magnella
Bucculatrix makabana
Bucculatrix malivorella
Bucculatrix maritima
Bucculatrix mehadiensis
Bucculatrix melipecta
Bucculatrix mellita
Bucculatrix mendax
Bucculatrix mesoporphyra
Bucculatrix micropunctata
Bucculatrix mirnae
Bucculatrix monelpis
Bucculatrix montana
Bucculatrix muraseae
Bucculatrix myricae
Bucculatrix nebulosa
Bucculatrix needhami
Bucculatrix nepalica
Bucculatrix nigricomella
Bucculatrix nigripunctella
Bucculatrix nigrovalvata
Bucculatrix niveella
Bucculatrix noltei
Bucculatrix nota
Bucculatrix notella
Bucculatrix ochristrigella
Bucculatrix ochrisuffusa
Bucculatrix ochritincta
Bucculatrix ochromeris
Bucculatrix oncota
Bucculatrix oppositella
Bucculatrix orophilella
Bucculatrix packardella
Bucculatrix paliuricola
Bucculatrix pallidula
Bucculatrix pannonica
Bucculatrix parasimilis
Bucculatrix paroptila
Bucculatrix parthenica
Bucculatrix parvinotata
Bucculatrix pectinella
Bucculatrix pectinifera
Bucculatrix perfixa
Bucculatrix pertusella
Bucculatrix phagnalella
Bucculatrix platyphylla
Bucculatrix plucheae
Bucculatrix polymniae
Bucculatrix polytita
Bucculatrix pomifoliella
Bucculatrix porthmis
Bucculatrix praecipua
Bucculatrix pseudosylvella
Bucculatrix ptochastis
Bucculatrix pyrenaica
Bucculatrix pyrivorella
Bucculatrix quadrigemina
Bucculatrix quieta
Bucculatrix quinquenotella
Bucculatrix ramallahensis
Bucculatrix ratisbonensis
Bucculatrix recognita
Bucculatrix regaella
Bucculatrix rhamniella
Bucculatrix ruficoma
Bucculatrix saccharata
Bucculatrix sagax
Bucculatrix salutatoria
Bucculatrix sanaaensis
Bucculatrix santolinella
Bucculatrix seneciensis
Bucculatrix seorsa
Bucculatrix separabilis
Bucculatrix serratella
Bucculatrix sexnotata
Bucculatrix similis
Bucculatrix simulans
Bucculatrix sinevi
Bucculatrix solidaginiella
Bucculatrix sororcula
Bucculatrix speciosa
Bucculatrix spectabilis
Bucculatrix sphaeralceae
Bucculatrix splendida
Bucculatrix sporobolella
Bucculatrix staintonella
Bucculatrix statica
Bucculatrix stictopus
Bucculatrix subnitens
Bucculatrix taeniola
Bucculatrix tanymorpha
Bucculatrix telavivella
Bucculatrix tenebricosa
Bucculatrix tetanota
Bucculatrix tetradymiae
Bucculatrix thoracella
Bucculatrix thurberiella
Bucculatrix transversata
Bucculatrix transversella
Bucculatrix tridenticola
Bucculatrix trifasciella
Bucculatrix tsurubamella
Bucculatrix tubulosa
Bucculatrix ulmella
Bucculatrix ulmicola
Bucculatrix ulmifoliae
Bucculatrix ulocarena
Bucculatrix unipuncta
Bucculatrix univoca
Bucculatrix ussurica
Bucculatrix varia
Bucculatrix variabilis
Bucculatrix verax
Bucculatrix viguierae
Bucculatrix wittnebeni
Bucculatrix xanthophylla
Bucculatrix xenaula
Bucculatrix yemenitica
Bucculatrix zizyphella
Bucculatrix zophopasta

Status unclear
Bucculatrix acerifolia Heinrich, 1937 (described from Germany)
Bucculatrix acerifoliae Heinrich, 1937 (described from Switzerland)
Bucculatrix auripicta Matsumura, 1931 (described from Japan)
Bucculatrix helianthemi (=Dichomeris helianthemi?) (recorded food plant: Helianthemum sessiliflorum)
Bucculatrix imitatella Herrich-Schäffer, 1855 
Bucculatrix turatii Standfuss, 1887 (recorded food plant: Paliurus aculeatus)

References

External links

Fauna Europaea
Nearctic Lepidoptera
Tree of Life

 
Monotypic Lepidoptera taxa
Moth families
Leaf miners
Taxa named by Philipp Christoph Zeller